Himantolophus albinares is a species of footballfish, a type of anglerfish. It is endemic to the Atlantic Ocean. As of 1999, a total of four specimens had been found.

References

Himantolophidae
Deep sea fish
Taxa named by Günther Maul
Fish described in 1961